The Europe Zone was one of the three regional zones of the 1978 Davis Cup.

29 teams entered the Europe Zone, competing across 2 sub-zones. 25 teams entered the competition in the qualifying round, competing for 4 places in each sub-zone's main draw to join the 4 finalists from the 1977 Europe Zone. The winners of each sub-zone's main draw went on to compete in the Inter-Zonal Zone against the winners of the Americas Zone and Eastern Zone.

Great Britain defeated Czechoslovakia in the Zone A final, and Sweden defeated Hungary in the Zone B final, resulting in both Great Britain and Sweden progressing to the Inter-Zonal Zone.

Zone A

Preliminary rounds

Draw

First round
Monaco vs. Luxembourg

Israel vs. Finland

Netherlands vs. Greece

Algeria vs. Iran

Qualifying round
Monaco vs. Great Britain

Israel vs. Austria

Czechoslovakia vs. Netherlands

Poland vs. Iran

Main draw

Draw

Quarterfinals
Great Britain vs. Austria

Czechoslovakia vs. Poland

Semifinals
France vs. Great Britain

Czechoslovakia vs. Romania

Final
Great Britain vs. Czechoslovakia

Zone B

Pre-qualifying round

Draw

Results
Morocco vs. Turkey

Preliminary rounds

Draw

First round
Morocco vs. Norway

Ireland vs. Portugal

Belgium vs. Denmark

Switzerland vs. Egypt

Qualifying round
Morocco vs. Yugoslavia

Ireland vs. Sweden

Hungary vs. Belgium

Switzerland vs. West Germany

Main draw

Draw

Quarterfinals
Yugoslavia vs. Sweden

Hungary vs. West Germany

Semifinals
Sweden vs. Spain

Hungary vs. Italy

Final
Sweden vs. Hungary

References

Davis Cup Europe/Africa Zone
Europe Zone
Davis Cup
Davis Cup
Davis Cup
Davis Cup
Davis Cup
Davis Cup